Benjamin S. Cook is an American scientist, entrepreneur, advisory board member, professor, and author. He is best known for his pioneering work in printed electronics and for implementing the first semiconductor-compatible printed electronics process, VIPRE.  He holds over 150 patents and patents pending, and over 100 peer reviewed journal and conference publications.

Biography
Benjamin S. Cook received the Bachelor of Science degree from Rose-Hulman Institute of Technology , the Master of Science degree from King Abdullah University of Science and Technology, and the Doctor of Philosophy degree in electrical engineering and materials science from Georgia Institute of Technology.

From 2006 to 2014, he was the founder and president of Soft-Tronics, a technology consulting firm which partnered with technology startups to accelerate growth and market penetration.  In 2014, he joined Texas Instruments Kilby Labs to industrialize his pioneering work in semiconductor printed electronics and additive manufacturing.  Currently, he is the Sr. Director of Texas Instruments' Nanotechnology Organization and holds advisory positions on the Rose-Hulman Academic Advisory Board, the Elsevier Journal of Additive Manufacturing, as well as several other research consortiums.

Awards 
 Member of the Group Technical Staff, Texas Instruments (2016)
 Rose-Hulman Career Achievement Award, Alumni of the Year (2016)
 Intel Doctoral Fellowship Award (2013)
 IEEE Antennas & Propagation Society Doctoral Fellowship Award (2012)
 Rose-Hulman Engineer of the Year (2010)

Books 
 Handbook of Flexible Electronics: Materials, Manufacturing and Applications, Woodhead Publishing
 Handbook of Antenna Technologies: Advanced Antenna Fabrication Processes (MEMS/LTCC/LCP/Printing), Springer Publishing
 Green RFID Systems: Materials and Substrates, Cambridge Press

References

External links
 Google Scholar profile

Living people
Year of birth missing (living people)
American electronics engineers
Rose–Hulman Institute of Technology alumni
Georgia Tech alumni
Scientists from Chicago
Texas Instruments people
American non-fiction writers
American engineering writers